Talataye  is a village and rural commune in the Cercle of Ansongo in the Gao Region of south-eastern Mali. The commune has an area of approximately 8,126 square kilometers. In the 2009 census it had a population of 13,907.

References

External links
 .

Communes of Gao Region